Weyba Downs is a rural locality in the Sunshine Coast Region, Queensland, Australia.

Geography
Weyba Downs is on the Sunshine Coast. The eastern boundary of the locality is the western shore of Lake Weyba, a tidal lake that flows into Noosa River and is within the locality of Noosaville.

History 
Weyba is believed to mean "place of stingrays" or "place of flying squirrels". Weyba Downs now covers the area previously known as Peregian Beach South.

References

External links
 

Suburbs of the Sunshine Coast Region
Localities in Queensland